Brooklyn McDougall (born August 23, 1998) is a Canadian long track speed skater who specializes in the sprint distances.

Career
McDougall's first senior competition came in 2020, when she won a gold in the women's team sprint and silver in the 500 m at the 2020 Four Continents Speed Skating Championships in Milwaukee, Wisconsin.

In February 2020, McDougall made her World Cup debut in Calgary.

In October 2021, McDougall won the 500 m event at the 2021 Canadian long-track speed-skating championships in her hometown with a time of 37.851, which was a new personal best.

In January 2022, McDougall was named to her first Olympic team, where she will contest the 500 m event.

Personal records

References

External links

1998 births
Living people
Canadian female speed skaters
Speed skaters from Calgary
Speed skaters at the 2022 Winter Olympics
Olympic speed skaters of Canada
World Single Distances Speed Skating Championships medalists
21st-century Canadian women